Carlos Alberto Pinto Fonseca (1933–2006) was a Brazilian musician.  He was born in Belo Horizonte, in the state of Minas Gerais.

Career
Pinto Fonseca had a very successful career as a conductor. He won several conducting competitions, not only in Brazil, but also in Argentina and Italy. Under his direction, the Madrigal Ars Nova toured in South America and Europe and achieved international recognition as one of the best Brazilian choral groups. Pinto Fonseca is well known for his arrangements of folk music. The Missa Afro-Brasileiria (1976) won the "Best Vocal Work" prize of the Associação dos Críticos de São Paulo, and later became his most popular choral work in the United States.

Muié Rendêra
Two of the most popular folk tunes from Northeast Brazil are combined in this Pinto Fonseca
arrangement: Olê, Muié Rendêra and É Lampa, é Lampa, é Lampeão. Although Pinto Fonseca emphasizes the rhythmic aspect of the piece, his choral writing is very clear, which allows the listener to identify the melodies very easily. The simple harmonic vocabulary reinforces the simplicity of the style. In performance, the addition of percussion will strengthen the character of the baião, a Brazilian folk dance. María Guinand is the editor of the piece.

Text
 Brazilian text

 Olê, muié rendêra
 olê, muié renda
 tu me ensina a fazê rendá
 que eu te ensino a namorá.

 Virgulino é Lampeão.
 É Lampa, é Lampa, é Lampa,
 é Lampeão.
 O seu nome é Virgulino,
 o apelido é Lampeão.

 English translation

 Hey, lacemaker woman,
 hey, lacemaker woman,
 if you teach me how to weave,
 I'll teach you how to court (love).

 Virgulino is Lampeão
 He is Lampa, Lampa, Lampa,
 he is Lampeão.
 His name is Virgulino,
 his nickname is Lampeão.

References

1933 births
2006 deaths
Brazilian conductors (music)
People from Belo Horizonte
20th-century conductors (music)